Achada Furna is a settlement in the southern part of the island of Fogo, Cape Verde. It is situated 15 km east of the island capital São Filipe. At the 2010 census its population was 495. Its elevation is about 870 meters. Nearby places include Cabeça Fundão to the north, Figueira Pavão to the east, Fonte Aleixo to the south and Monte Largo to the west.

Climate
Its climate is cooler than the low-lying areas of the island. Average rainfall is 366 millimeters, the highest is 149 mm in September and the lowest is without a single precipitation between the months of March and May.

See also
List of villages and settlements in Cape Verde

References

Villages and settlements in Fogo, Cape Verde
Santa Catarina do Fogo